Apa or Appa (also Alban; died after 1161) was a nobleman in the Kingdom of Hungary in the second half of the 12th century, who held courtly positions and elevated into the dignity of Ban of Slavonia during the last period of the reign of Géza II of Hungary.

Ancestry
His origin is unknown, but his brother was the powerful and well-educated prelate, Lucas, Archbishop of Esztergom. According to Mór Wertner, Apa's namesake father was that Apa, who was referred one of the powerful lords in 1108, during the reign of Coloman the Learned. From the 18th century onwards, several historians and genealogists attempted to connect Apa and Lucas to various notable genera (clans) in the Kingdom of Hungary, mostly the illustrious Gutkeled clan. Historian Ubul Kállay argued Apa and Lucas were the sons of Alexius Gutkeled, a Ban of Slavonia during the reign of Stephen II of Hungary.

Career
Apa was first mentioned by contemporary records in 1148, when he was already referred to as a comes by a privilege letter of Géza II. He was styled as "apud regem gratiosissimus" in 1150, reflecting his distinguished status in the royal court by that time. He functioned as ispán of Bodrog County in 1156, but it is possible he already held the dignity from the previous decade, when he was frequently mentioned as comes (or ispán) without the specific county. The brothers – Apa and Lucas – came to prominence after the departure of King Géza's maternal uncle, Beloš, who became disgraced at the royal court and fled Hungary in late 1157. As his successor, Apa was made Ban of Slavonia. It is plausible he bore the dignity until Géza's death in 1162. In this capacity, he governed the Dalmatian coastal region (Croatian Littoral or Primorje), and the area between the rivers Drava and Sava still did not fall under his jurisdiction. As there is no known office-holder of the dignity Palatine of Hungary in the last years of Géza II, it is possible that Apa was the most powerful secular confidant of the monarch after Beloš' departure, while Lucas was elevated into the archbishopric of Esztergom, becoming head of the Church in Hungary in the same time.

According to a non-authentic charter, he also served as Judge royal in 1158. The charter also refers to a certain Emeric, who bore the title of "curialis comes minor", which is a possible first mention of the office of vice-judge royal. Ban Apa possessed lands in the northeastern part of Hungary, mostly Ung and Zemplén counties. He owned the village of Kána (present-day archaeological ruins in Budapest). He erected a Benedictine abbey there.

According to a decretal of Pope Alexander III, when the papal legate, cardinal Pietro di Miso was sent to Hungary to hand over the pallium to Lucas of Esztergom in 1161, the archbishop's brother "Alban" (most scholars identified him with Apa) provided a horse for the legate, when Pietro and his escort entered the Hungarian border via Dalmatia (thus Apa perhaps still functioned as ban in that year). The letter narrates that Archbishop Lucas worried this step could be considered as simony in the Roman Curia. Pope Alexander reassured the prelate with Biblical phrases. This is the last mention of Apa as a living person.

References

Sources

 
 
 
 
 

Bans of Slavonia
Judges royal
12th-century Hungarian people
Founders of Christian monasteries